is a Japanese mecha anime television series produced by Sunrise that aired from 1980 to 1981. It was also referred to as "Trider G7", "Unchallengeable Trider G7", "Tryder G7", "Bird Attack Tryder G7" and "Unrivaled Robot Trider G7".

The story follows sixth-grader Watta Takeo's life as he balances his school life, being the president of a company, and battling a robotic empire from outer space. While a Super Robot series at heart, it depicts a real world take on the genre, such as announcing to nearby citizens that Trider G7 was being activated and as having to consider the monetary expenses of battle.

Plot
Invincible Robo Trider G7 portrays the attempted invasion by the Robot Empire to take over Earth. Rebelling against this, the scientist Nabalon, who was exiled from the Empire, meets the protagonist Watta's father, and together, they design the transforming robot Trider G7. However, Watta's father dies in an accident, and Watta has no choice but to succeed him at both his job and piloting Trider. As the president of the Takeo General Company, Watta must now fight to ensure everyone's happiness, as well as the condition of the company's funds.

Characters

Takeo General Company

The orphaned second president of the company, called "Young President" by his subordinates as he is only in the sixth grade. he is the only person that can utilize Trider G7. He is full of valor despite his age, and takes his role as the pilot of Trider G7 with great pride.

A manager 64 years of age; he can immediately calculate how much costs for Trider G7's basic functions will be.

A director, and the only mechanic; he can do everything from repairing Trider to fixing an air conditioner. He pilots the Shuttle and provides support for Watta. 

A subsection chief, but he doesn't actually get much work due to the company's structure. He is frivolous, but jovial, and other characters find it impossible to hate him.

The only woman of the company, an 18-year-old girl in charge of accounting, office work, and making tea.

Watta's father, and the previous president of the company. Deceased by the time the anime begins.

Trider G7's designer, and a scientist who defected to Earth from the Robot Empire.

Mechanics

The titular robot of the series, piloted by Watta Takeo. It stands at 57 meters tall and weighs 777 tons. It hosts a variety of weapons, including the Trider Saber and the Trider Beam Cannon. It is able to transform into six distinct states, each one useful for a different terrain, such as space, land, sky, and water.

A support shuttle for the Trider G7 that first appears in episode 27. Kakikouji, Tetsuo, Touhachirou, and Sunabara all pilot it. Its main armament is a pair of missile launchers.

Production
The narration in the show was performed by Ichirou Nagai, who did the narration for Mobile Suit Gundam. Up until that point, many series airing on TV Asahi in the series' timeslot had their soundtracks composed by Takeo Watanabe and Yuushi Matsuyama, but as the two were working on the soundtrack for the theatrical adaptation of Mobile Suit Gundam, Kurando Kaya filled in the role.

Themes
Rather than depicting robots as a military weapon like Mobile Suit Gundam did, the aim of the story was to portray how a giant robot would be operated in the real world. Trider G7's own unrealistic abilities are explained with scientists that were exiled from the enemy empire, as Trider G7's capabilities are far beyond that of the other Earth-made robots in the show. In addition, the Robot Empire was notable compared to other villains from contemporary mecha series by having little to no interaction with the human protagonists, as they are unaware that their own scientists built Trider G7.

Media
Invincible Robo Trider G7 aired from February 2, 1980 until January 24, 1981, spanning 50 episodes. It was also broadcast in Italy in 1981 under the name L'Indistruttibile Robot Trider G7. As with other super robot shows of the time, toys of the titular robot were produced by the toy company Clover.

A DVD boxset of the series was released in 2005, and an Italian boxset was released in 2012 which contains both the Italian dub and the original Japanese audio. The series has been featured in various installments of the Super Robot Wars franchise of video games as well, including Shin Super Robot Wars and the Super Robot Wars Z metaseries.

References

External links
Official website 
Sunrise series introduction website 

1980 anime television series debuts
1980 Japanese television series debuts
1981 Japanese television series endings
Alien invasions in television
Sunrise (company)
Super robot anime and manga